Chotutice is a municipality and village in Kolín District in the Central Bohemian Region of the Czech Republic. It has about 500 inhabitants.

History
The first written mention of Chotutice is from 1100.

References

Villages in Kolín District